The 2021–22 Thai League 3 Eastern region is a region in the regional stage of the 2021–22 Thai League 3. The tournament was sponsored by Blue Dragon Lottery Online, and known as the Blue Dragon League for sponsorship purposes. A total of 12 teams located in Eastern of Thailand will compete in the league of the Eastern region.

Teams

Number of teams by province

Stadiums and locations

Foreign players

A T3 team could register 3 foreign players from foreign players all around the world. A team can use 3 foreign players on the field in each game.
Note :: players who released during second leg transfer window;: players who registered during second leg transfer window.

League table

Standings

Positions by round

Results by round

Results

Season statistics

Top scorers
As of 26 February 2022.

Hat-tricks 

Notes: 4 = Player scored 4 goals; (H) = Home team; (A) = Away team

Clean sheets 
As of 26 February 2022.

Attendances

Overall statistical table

Attendances by home match played

Source: Thai League

See also
 2021–22 Thai League 1
 2021–22 Thai League 2
 2021–22 Thai League 3
 2021–22 Thai League 3 Northern Region
 2021–22 Thai League 3 Northeastern Region
 2021–22 Thai League 3 Western Region
 2021–22 Thai League 3 Southern Region
 2021–22 Thai League 3 Bangkok Metropolitan Region
 2021–22 Thai League 3 National Championship
 2021–22 Thai FA Cup
 2021–22 Thai League Cup
 2021 Thailand Champions Cup

References

External links
 Official website of Thai League

Thai League 3
3